The National Institute of Fisheries Science (previous called National Fisheries Research and Development Institute or NFRDI), is a scientific body operated by the South Korean government, under the authority of the Ministry for Food, Agriculture, Forestry and Fisheries.  It was first established in 1921.  Subsidiary institutes operate in each of the major Korean fisheries.

The NFRDI is headquartered in Gijang-eup, Gijang-gun, northern Busan.

See also
Fishing industry of South Korea
Fisheries management

External links
Official site, in Korean and English

Organizations based in Busan
Government agencies of South Korea
Fisheries and aquaculture research institutes
Fishing in South Korea